Rasmus Friis (born 19 November 1871, date of death unknown) was a Danish sports shooter. He competed in two events at the 1912 Summer Olympics.

References

External links
 

1871 births
Year of death missing
People from Lolland Municipality
People from Lolland
Danish male sport shooters
Olympic shooters of Denmark
Shooters at the 1912 Summer Olympics
Sportspeople from Region Zealand